Brao is a Mon–Khmer language of Cambodia and Laos.

Phonology

Varieties
According to Ethnologue, there are four distinct but mutually intelligible varieties, sometimes considered separate languages: Lave (Brao proper), Kru’ng (Kreung), and Kavet (Kravet), the latter spoken by only a couple thousand.

Sidwell (2003) also lists four communities of speakers, three of which are in Cambodia.
Laveh (Lave, Rawe): spoken in Attapeu Province, Laos south of the capital city of Attapeu. Laveh is the official designation given by the Laotian government.
Krung (Krüng, "Krung 2"): spoken around Ban Lung in Ratanakiri Province, Cambodia
Kavet (Kravet): spoken in Voeun Sai District, Ratanakiri Province, Cambodia
Brao (Brou, Palaw, Preou): spoken in and around the town of Taveng in Ratanakiri Province, Cambodia

Lun, spoken in Stung Treng Province, Cambodia, is related to Lave and Kavet (Philip Lambrecht 2012).

Demographics
Sidwell (2003) suggests the possibility of a total of 50,000 speakers, while Bradley (1994:161) gives an estimate of 35,000. All estimates below are drawn from Sidwell (2003:30).
Laos: The 1995 Laotian census places the Laveh population at 17,544.
Cambodia: The Asian Development Bank gave an estimate of 29,500 speakers as of the early 2000s.
Vietnam: About 300 Brau live in Đắc Mế village, Bờ Y commune, Ngọc Hồi district, Kon Tum province (Đặng, et al. 2010:112). Parkin (1991:81) also estimates several hundred Brao in Vietnam.
Thailand: Parkin (1991:81) estimates a Brao population of 2,500 in Thailand.

References

Sidwell, Paul (2003). A Handbook of comparative Bahnaric, Vol. 1: West Bahnaric. Pacific Linguistics, 551. Canberra: Research School of Pacific and Asian Studies, Australian National University.

Further reading
Keller, C. E. (1976). A grammatical sketch of Brao, a Mon–Khmer language. Grand Forks, N.D.: Summer Institute of Linguistics, University of North Dakota Session. OCLC: 2915938

Bahnaric languages
Languages of Laos
Languages of Cambodia